Arian Llugiqi (born 24 October 2002) is a German professional footballer who plays as a forward for  club FC Ingolstadt.

He is of dual German and Kosovan nationality.

References

External links

2002 births
Living people
German footballers
Association football forwards
2. Bundesliga players
3. Liga players
Oberliga (football) players
SV Wacker Burghausen players
FC Ingolstadt 04 players
FC Ingolstadt 04 II players